Douglas A. Silliman (born 1960) is the president of the Arab Gulf States Institute in Washington and a former American diplomat who served as United States Ambassador to Kuwait (2014-16) and Iraq (2016-19).

Early life and education 
Silliman was born in Castro Valley, California. At age 11, his family moved to the Houston, Texas area, where Silliman attended high school. He graduated summa cum laude from Baylor University in 1982, with a bachelor's degree in political science and foreign service, and he is a member of Phi Beta Kappa. He studied Russian and traveled as part of a university group to Central Asia and the Caucasus. Silliman then went on to earn a master's degree in international relations from the George Washington University. His graduate thesis covered the concept and execution of Soviet city planning.

Career 
Silliman joined the State Department as a Foreign Service officer in April 1984. He first worked as a visa officer in Port-au-Prince, Haiti, during an uprising that overthrew Haitian dictator Jean-Claude Duvalier. He then became a political officer at the U.S. Embassy in Tunis, Tunisia.

He returned to Washington in 1988 and worked as a staff assistant to then-Assistant Secretary of State for Near Eastern and South Asian Affairs Ambassador Richard Murphy, and later, John Kelly. He was the desk officer for Lebanon at a time when the U.S. Embassy in Beirut was closed for long periods.

Silliman then moved to the Soviet Union desk where he covered Soviet policy in Asia until the rise of Boris Yeltsin. At that time, he was the only officer on the Soviet desk who had traveled to Central Asia, leading him to take over responsibility for the five new countries of Central Asia in 1991. Later, he became the internal political officer at the U.S. Embassy in Islamabad, Pakistan as Benazir Bhutto became prime minister for the first time. He returned to Washington as the regional officer for the Middle East in the Office of the Coordinator for Counterterrorism, where he wrote the underlying legal documents to designate 17 groups, including Hezbollah and the Popular Front for the Liberation of Palestine, as terrorist organizations.

Silliman studied Arabic and then served as a political counselor at the U.S. Embassy in Amman, Jordan from 2000-04. He returned to Washington as the deputy director, then director, of the Office of Southern European Affairs, dealing with Turkey, Greece, and Cyprus. Silliman then moved to Ankara, Turkey, where he served as the deputy chief of mission for three U.S. ambassadors. He was tapped to be the minister counselor for political affairs at the U.S. Embassy in Iraq in 2011, and in 2012 he became the deputy chief of mission in Baghdad. During that time, he worked closely with U.S. forces as they withdrew from Iraq and helped conceptualize the U.S. relationship with Iraq after the departure of U.S. troops. As deputy chief of mission in Iraq, Silliman significantly downsized the embassy, bringing the total number of direct-hire U.S. government personnel and contractors from more than 16,000 to about 6,000 and significantly reducing the budget. President Barack Obama nominated Silliman to serve as the U.S. ambassador to Kuwait. While awaiting confirmation, he served as a senior advisor in the State Department’s Bureau of Near Eastern Affairs, where he worked on Iraq issues and coordinated the participation of the five North African Arab states in the United States Africa Leaders Summit hosted by Obama in Washington, D.C., in August 2014.

Following his Senate confirmation, Silliman arrived as ambassador to Kuwait on September 15, 2014. As ambassador, he led U.S. efforts to commemorate the 25th anniversary of the liberation of Kuwait and expand trade and investment between the United States and Kuwait.

Obama then nominated Silliman ambassador to Iraq. He was confirmed by the Senate in July 2016 and arrived in Baghdad on September 1, 2016. He worked closely with the U.S. military’s Combined Joint Task Force – Operation Inherent Resolve, the international coalition to counter the Islamic State in Iraq and the Levant, Iraqi Prime Minister Haider al-Abadi, and the Iraqi military to coordinate the prosecution of the war against ISIL. Silliman also played a prominent role with the United Nations and other Western donors to provide humanitarian assistance to Iraqis displaced by war and assure demining and stabilization efforts so that displaced Iraqis could return to their homes. After ISIL was pushed out of Iraq, he played a crucial role in implementing the policy the administration of President Donald J. Trump of focusing assistance on the Yazidi and Christian communities that had been targeted by ISIL, aiming to limit Iranian activities in the region, defeat ISIL in Syria, and help U.S. companies conduct business in Iraq. He received the Presidential Distinguished Service Award from President Trump in 2018 for his service in Iraq. Silliman departed Baghdad in January 2019 and retired from the Foreign Service that April.

In June 2019, Silliman was named president of the Arab Gulf States Institute in Washington, a D.C.-based research institution focused on the Gulf Arab state and key neighboring countries. Following the January 2020 U.S. drone strike that killed Iranian Quds Force leader Qassim Suleimani and Iraqi militia leader Abu Mahdi al-Muhandis at Baghdad International Airport, Silliman was a frequent commentator on domestic and international media where he argued for de-escalation of tensions between the United States and Iran and a clearer articulation of U.S. foreign policy goals in the region.

Silliman married Catherine Raia Silliman in 1990, and they have two adult children. He currently resides in the Washington, D.C. metro area.

References

1960 births
Living people
21st-century American diplomats
Baylor University alumni
Ambassadors of the United States to Kuwait
People from Houston
Ambassadors of the United States to Iraq